Tomorrow is the third studio album by Taiwanese singer Elva Hsiao, released on 21 April 2001 by Virgin Records Taiwan. The songs, "I Love You Lots" and "Tomorrow", reached number twenty–six and forty–nine respectively on Hit FM Annual Top 100 Singles in 2001.

Track listing

References

External links

2001 albums
Elva Hsiao albums